The 2022 South Australian National Football League season (officially the SANFL Hostplus League) was the 143rd season of the South Australian National Football League (SANFL), the highest-level Australian rules football competition in South Australia. The season commenced on 1 April and concluded with the Grand Final on 18 September.

Fixture
 For results see here

Ladder

Finals series

Qualifying and Elimination Finals

Semi-finals

Preliminary final

Grand Final

See also
 2022 SANFL Women's League season

References 

South Australian National Football League seasons
SANFL